Walter Buchanan (1797 – 1877) was a British Whig and Liberal politician.

Buchan was elected Whig MP for Glasgow at a by-election in 1857—caused by the resignation of John MacGregor—and, becoming a Liberal in 1859, held the seat until 1865 when he did not seek re-election.

References

External links
 

UK MPs 1852–1857
UK MPs 1857–1859
UK MPs 1859–1865
1797 births
1877 deaths
Whig (British political party) MPs for Scottish constituencies
Scottish Liberal Party MPs
Members of the Parliament of the United Kingdom for Glasgow constituencies